No. 1 Long Range Flight was a temporary Royal Australian Air Force unit formed to participate in the 1953 London-to-Christchurch air race (also known as the Christchurch Centenary air race). The flight was established in February 1953 and was equipped with three  Canberra bombers, specially modified between June and August. Following extensive training, two Canberras departed for the UK in mid-September. The race began on 9 October, and one of the flight's aircraft placed second, with a total flying time of 22 hours and 29 minutes. The other aircraft was forced out of the race when one of its tyres burst while landing at Cocos Island to refuel, but completed its flight to Christchurch after being repaired. After a brief period in New Zealand both aircraft returned to Australia to be modified back to a standard configuration, and the flight was disbanded in November.

History

Training
No. 1 Long Range Flight was formed at RAAF Base Laverton on 16 February 1953 to begin preparations for the RAAF's participation in the London-to-Christchurch air race. Squadron Leader Peter Raw became the unit's initial commanding officer 23 February, and held this position until May when the more senior Wing Commander Derek R. Cuming assumed command. Cuming had been the first man to fly a jet aircraft in Australia (a Gloster Meteor in 1946), and had previously commanded the RAAF's Aircraft Research and Development Unit (ARDU). In announcing his appointment to command No. 1 Long Range Flight, Minister for Air William McMahon described Cuming as the "RAAF's outstanding test pilot".

The flight received its first aircraft, the Canberra bomber A84-307, on 15 June 1953. This aircraft had been built in Britain as the RAAF's first Canberra, and was flown to Australia by Wing Commander Cuming in July 1951. The journey had been completed in 21 hours and 41 minutes, setting an unofficial record for the route. The flight's second aircraft, A84-201, arrived on 1 July. This was the first Australian-built Canberra and was assigned to No. 1 Long Range Flight shortly after being completed. The second Australian-built Canberra, A84-202, was also assigned to the flight in August. All three aircraft were modified for their specialised role by No. 1 Aircraft Depot. These modifications included fitting distance-measuring equipment in each of the aircraft and three fuel tanks in their bomb bays. Wing Commander Cuming told journalists in August that the Australian-made Canberras were preferred to the British models on the grounds of national prestige and because the aircraft were fitted with superior navigation equipment.  A84-307 was retained by the flight, however, as the reserve aircraft to be used if modifications to A84-202 were not completed in time for the race.

No. 1 Long Range Flight undertook intensive training in the lead-up to the race. This involved making regular long range return flights between Laverton and Ceylon, Singapore and Christchurch via various air bases in Australia. These exercises were used to establish fuel consumption rates and practice the refuelling and navigation practices that would be used in the race. As part of this training the flight broke many Australian and New Zealand air speed records, setting the fastest time for crossing the Tasman Sea during a flight between RAAF Base Amberley and Christchurch on 16 August. An aeronautical engineer was attached to No. 1 Long Range Flight from the Department of Air to calculate the optimum route for the Canberras to take. On 2 September Cuming and Raw visited the Government Aircraft Factories facility at Fishermans Bend in Melbourne to thank the workers who were building Canberra bombers for the RAAF.

Race and aftermath
Selected as Australia's entries in the London-to-Christchurch air race, A84-201 and A84-202 departed Laverton bound for the UK on 10 September 1953, and arrived at RAF Lyneham on the 16th of the month. Detachments of No. 1 Long Range Flight ground crew were stationed in the UK, Bahrain, Ratmalana Airport in Ceylon, Cocos Island in the Indian Ocean and Christchurch. The first of these detachments departed Australia for the UK on 9 September. The detachments that were stationed at Bahrain and Ratmalana Airport left Laverton on board a RAAF Dakota transport on 25 September. Each of the detachments was led by a RAAF navigator, whose main role was to develop a flight plan for the next leg of the race and provide it to the aircrew to minimise the time they spent on the ground. The RAAF also supported its entrants and the aircraft from other countries by deploying an air traffic control team and specialised radar equipment to Christchurch, as well as stationing P-2 Neptune long-range patrol aircraft at Cocos Island, Perth and RAAF Base East Sale for search-and-rescue coverage. The Royal Australian Navy aircraft carrier HMAS Vengeance and destroyer  were stationed in the Tasman Sea to provide weather reports for the race.

The London-to-Christchurch air race began on 9 October. A84-202, which was piloted by Wing Commander Cuming, took off from London Airport at 3:50 am. A84-201, piloted by Squadron Leader Raw, followed five minutes later. Each of the Canberras was also manned by a co-pilot and a navigator. The aircraft flew separately to Bahrain, where they made a brief refuelling stop, then continued to Ratmalana Airport and Cocos Island where they refuelled again. One of A84-202's tyres burst while landing at Cocos Island, putting it out of the race. At this time A84-202 was two minutes ahead of A84-201 and 15 minutes ahead of any of the entrants from the Royal Air Force (RAF).

A84-201 continued and next landed at RAAF Woomera Airfield in South Australia to refuel. Its nose wheel locked up while landing due to ice accretion, but this was able to be repaired and the aircraft took off at 0:19 am, local time. The repairs delayed the aircraft by 83 minutes, however. A84-201 arrived at Harewood Airport in Christchurch at 4:32 am local time, and placed second in the race with a flight time of 22 hours and 29 minutes. The winning aircraft, RAF Canberra WE139, piloted by Flight Lieutenant Monty Burton completed its flight in 22 hours and 25 minutes. The £3,000 prize money awarded to Raw for placing second was later donated to the RAAF Welfare Trust Fund.

On 10 October two replacement tyres were flown to Cocos Island to repair A84-202. The aircraft departed on the 12th of the month and flew to Christchurch via Laverton; its total flying time was 22 hours and 23.5 minutes. Cuming later told journalists that A84-202's crew had drunk beer and gone for a swim while waiting for their aircraft to be repaired. Both Canberras later flew demonstration flights over Harewood Airport and RNZAF Base Whenuapai and returned to Laverton on 19 October. The aircraft were transferred to No. 1 Aircraft Depot on 2 November to be returned to standard configuration, and No. 1  Long Range Flight's overseas detachments had all returned to Australia by 6 November. The flight was disbanded on the 16th of the month. The total cost of the RAAF's entry in the air race was £50,000, which Minister McMahon claimed was a "bargain rate" given the results of the air force's participation.

After No. 1 Long Range Flight was disbanded, Wing Commander Cuming returned to the ARDU. He was subsequently appointed an Officer of the Order of the British Empire (OBE) on 31 December 1953 for leading the flight and participating in the London-to-Christchurch air race. Squadron Leader Raw was also awarded the Air Force Cross for his role in the race, the decoration being presented to him by Queen Elizabeth II at Brisbane on 10 March 1954. Raw had assumed command of No. 2 Squadron on 18 December; this was the first RAAF squadron to be equipped with Canberra bombers. Flight Lieutenant Francis Noel Davies, who had been Raw's co-pilot during the race, and two other airmen were killed on 16 June 1954 when A84-202 crashed near Amberley. Wing Commander Cuming presided over the four-man court of inquiry which investigated the cause of this accident. As of May 2011, A84-201 was a gate guard at RAAF Base Amberley.

References
Citations

Bibliography

Further reading

 

 

1
1
Military units and formations established in 1953
Military units and formations disestablished in 1953